Leonard Everett Fisher (born June 24, 1924) is an American artist best known for illustrating children's books. Since 1955 he has illustrated about 250 books for younger readers including about 88 that he also wrote.

Fisher was born in the Bronx borough of New York City in June 1924 and was raised in the Sea Gate section of Brooklyn. Fisher served in the U.S. Army during World War II. He began his formal art training with his Brooklyn-born father, Benjamin M. Fisher, a designer of naval vessels, who contributed to the construction of Simon Lake submarines in Bridgeport, Connecticut, and such US Navy warships as USS Arizona, USS Honolulu, and USS North Carolina—all designed, built, and commissioned at the Brooklyn, New York Navy Yard (1913–1937). Between 1932 and 1942, Leonard Everett Fisher continued his training at the Heckscher Foundation (NY), with Moses and Raphael Soyer (NY), with Reginald Marsh at the Art Students League of New York, and Serge Chermayeff at Brooklyn College. He is a graduate of Yale University (BFA 1949, MFA 1950).

On July 15, 2014, Fisher was announced as a finalist for the 2015 NSK Neustadt Prize for Children's Literature.

He lives in Westport, Connecticut, with his wife, Margery, a retired school librarian, and member of New York's Bank Street College of Education's Children's Book Committee. They are the parents of three children and the grandparents of six.

References

External links 

Westport Arts Center
Ask Art website
 Leonard Everett Fisher at Library of Congress Authorities — with 175 catalog records
Interview with Leonard Everett Fisher, All About Kids! TV Series #83 (1991)

 

1924 births
Living people
20th-century American painters
American children's book illustrators
American children's writers
American male painters
United States Army personnel of World War II
Painters from New York City
Artists from the Bronx
People from Sea Gate, Brooklyn
20th-century American male artists